The Billabong XXL is a global big wave award.  This event gathers big wave surfers from all around the world in a one contest.  Every year, surfers ride big waves for prizes, for example; Pacifico Paddle, Biggest Wave, Pacifico Tube, Performance Champion (women's and men's), Ride of the Year.

References

External links
 

Big wave surfing
Awards established in 1998
Sports trophies and awards